Bas van Daalen (born April 25, 1996 in Waalwijk, the Netherlands), known professionally by his stagename Will Grands, is a Dutch record producer, singer and songwriter.

Biography 
Van Daalen grew up in a small city Waalwijk in the Netherlands. His parents (Hennie van Daalen and Marina van Daalen) sent him to a music school to improve his musical development to take keyboard/piano lesson at music school "De Terp". At that age he learned to play guitar and piano. After 7 years he started to create music in a different way after he installed the demo of Fruity Loops

Bas was studying for audio/visual production on Sint-Lucas in Eindhoven. He quit school at the age of 18 to fully commit to his musical work.

Career 
At an early age he started to create EDM (electronic dance music). At the age of 16 Van Daalen renamed himself to "Van Dalen" and started to (co)-produce, compose and write for established artists. He connected with other DJ's and producers and got picked up by Artist Manager Robbert Winnemuller and Jasper Helderman (better known as Dj alvaro. In 2014 they produced an electronic house song called "Oldskool". The track peaked at number 3 on the Beatport Electro House chart. After that he wrote, co-produced and sung "Watching You". He is known for being multi-instrumental, a songwriter and singer.

In 2019 he co-produced songs for Major Lazer, Rudimental, Anne-Marie, Diplo, Ellie Goulding, Swae Lee, Jidenna, Kriss Kross Amsterdam and The Boy Next Door. The track "Let Me Live" by Rudimental and Major Lazer peaked at number 7 in the UK Dance Chart. After "Let Me Live", he co-produces the new single of Ellie Goulding and Diplo Close To Me. It was premiered by Annie Mac on BBC Radio 1 as the "Hottest Record in the World". In November 2018 he received 2 platinum records for the song" Whenever" by Kriss Kross Amsterdam and The Boy Next Door he co-produced. The song was on the radio 538 top-40 for over 20 weeks and peaked on number 4. Let me Live, Whenever and Close To Me reached far into the Global Spotify top 50 playlist.

His work on Major Lazer their 5th studio album called "Music Is The Weapon (Reloaded)" and J Balvin his album "Jose" led to his first work that got nominated for a grammy in 2021 in categories "Best dance/electronic album" and "Best Música Urbana album".

Releases

References

1996 births
Living people
People from Waalwijk
Dutch record producers
Dutch singers
Dutch songwriters